Type 73 may refer to:
 Hitachi Type 73, an artillery tractor
 Type 73 light machine gun, a North Korean light machine gun.
 Mitsubishi Type 73 Light Truck, a series of mini SUVs used by the JSDF.
 Type 73 Armored Personnel Carrier, a Japanese armored personnel carrier.